Mark Edmondson and John Fitzgerald were the defending champions, but Edmondson chose to compete at Stuttgart in the same week. Fitzgerald teamed up with Cliff Letcher and lost in the semifinals to Anders Järryd and Hans Simonsson.

Järryd and Simonsson won the title by defeating Joakim Nyström and Mats Wilander 0–6, 6–3, 7–6 in the final.

Seeds

Draw

Draw

References

External links
 Official results archive (ATP)
 Official results archive (ITF)

Men's Doubles
Doubles